Blue Murder may refer to:

Theatre, film and TV
 Blue Murder (Beatrix Christian play), a 1994 play by Beatrix Christian
 Blue Murder (Peter Nichols play), a 1995 play by Peter Nichols
 Blue Murder (miniseries), a 1995 Australian mini-series
 Blue Murder (UK TV series), a British detective series
 Blue Murder (Canadian TV series), a Canadian crime drama
 Blue Murder (1959 film), a 1959 Australian television movie
 Blue Murder (2000 film), a British television crime drama film

Music
 Blue Murder (folk group), a folk group
 Blue Murder (band), an English heavy metal band 
 Blue Murder (album), the band's debut album
"Blue Murder", song from Boy Cried Wolf
"Blue Murder", song by the Tom Robinson Band on the 1979 album TRB Two